Charles P. Limbert (1854-1923) was an American furniture designer. He is considered one of the most successful furniture leaders in the history of Grand Rapids and the Arts and Crafts movement in America. The furniture that bears his name is highly sought after and seriously collected to this day. His designs were mainly inspired by such diverse influences as English Arts and Crafts, Dutch folk furniture, Scottish architect/designer Charles Rennie Mackintosh, and the Vienna Secession.

Early Days
Limbert was born in Linesville, Pennsylvania in either 1854 or 1856, the son of cabinetmaker and furniture dealer Levi H. Limbert. After moving with his family in 1866 to Akron, Ohio, he later learned the furniture business in the 1870s at his father's store. As a young man in Akron, the first business he tried on his own was in the carriage trade.

Career
After leaving his adopted hometown in the mid-1880s, he moved west and began his career as a furniture salesman. Limbert started making chairs in Grand Rapids, Michigan while continuing to distribute furniture made by others.  After several major collaborations in the late 1800s, such as the “Klingman & Limbert Chair Co.” and his own furniture selling commission called “Charles P. Limbert & Co.”, he opened his own name brand company, the “Charles P. Limbert Furniture Co.” in Grand Rapids in 1902, and his own custom built factory in Holland, Michigan in 1906, where his entourage designed and built "Limbert's Holland Dutch Arts and Crafts Furniture". Limbert continued to manage his company until 1922, when poor health prompted him to sell his share in the company. The company closed in 1944, due to World War II.

Legacy
One of Limbert's most notable pieces, a jardiniere, was included among Stickley and other craftsmen's work in the 1973 show at the Art Museum of Princeton University that began the Arts and Crafts Revival.

Limbert's provided several major custom orders of furniture for the Old Faithful Inn in Yellowstone National Park. The hotel is still filled with Limbert Rockers, Arm-Chairs and Settles in the "Flanders" style, with a custom ordered yellow finish. Several wash stands remain in the Old House section of the Inn, and a number of pieces of Old Hickory furniture, a line represented by Limbert, are still in use.

References

External links
 Charles Limbert at the Arts and Crafts Society

1854 births
1923 deaths
People from Linesville, Pennsylvania
American furniture designers
American woodworkers
American furniture makers
American Craftsman architecture